May 11 - Eastern Orthodox Church calendar - May 13

All fixed commemorations below celebrated on May 25 by Orthodox Churches on the Old Calendar.

For May 12th, Orthodox Churches on the Old Calendar commemorate the Saints listed on April 29.

Saints
 Saint Domitilla the martyr (c. 81-96)
 Saints Nereus and Achilleus the martyrs (100)
 Saint Dracontius, Bishop of Nicaea (c. 1st to 3rd centuries)
 Saint Epiphanius, Bishop of Salamis and Metropolitan of Cyprus (403)
 Saint Calliope (Callitropos), nun, sister of St. Epiphanius of Cyprus.
 Saint Sabinus, Archbishop of Cyprus (successor of St. Epiphanius to the Cypriot cathedra) (5th century)
 Saint Polybius, Bishop of Cyprus, Wonderworker (5th century)
 Saint Theophanes, Archbishop of Cyprus (7th century)
 Patriarch Germanus I of Constantinople (740)
 Venerable Theodore of Kythera, ascetic (922)

Pre-Schism Western saints
 Saint Philip of Agira the Hieromartyr (103)
 Martyr Pancratius of Rome (304)
 Martyr Dionysius (Denis), uncle of St. Pancratius (304)
 Saint Díoma, teacher of St Declan of Ardmore, patron-saint of Kildimo in Co. Limerick in Ireland (5th century)
 Saint Modoald, Archbishop of Trier, related by blood and united by friendship with most of the saints of the Merovingian period (640)
 Saint Rictrudis, Abbess of Marchiennes Abbey in Flanders (688)
 Saint Æthelhard, Archbishop of Canterbury (805)

Post-Schism Orthodox saints
 Saint Euthemius (Euthymius), Patriarch of Jerusalem (c. 1084? c. 1224?))
 Saint Nikitas the Sinaite
 New Martyr John of Serres (15th century)
 Saint Theophanes, Bishop of Solea (Solia), Cyprus, later a hermit in the Troodos Mountains; the Outpourer of Myrrh (1550)
 Monk Dorotheus, (disciple of St. Dionysius of Troitse-Sergiyeva Lavra) (1622)
 Venerable Dionysius of Radonezh, Archimandrite of the Troitse-Sergiyeva Lavra(1633)
 New Martyr John of Wallachia, at Constantinople (1662)
 Saint Anthony (Medvedev) of Radonezh, Archimandrite of Troitse-Sergiyeva Lavra (1877)
 Repose of Saint Nectarius (Tikhonov) of Optina (1928)
 Holy Elders of the Sofronievo-Molchensk (Molchansk) Hermitage (glorification in 2009):
 Archimandrite Theodosy (Maslov);
 Hieromonk Serapion;
 Monk Sophronius (Batovrin); 
 Novice Sergius (Tikhonov), fool-for-Christ.

New martyrs and confessors
 New Martyr Abbess Athanasia (Lepeshkina), of the Smolensk Hodigitria Convent near Moscow (1931)
 New Hieromartyr Peter Popov, priest of Yaroslavl-Rostov (1937)
 Martyr Evdokia Martishkina (1938)

Other commemorations
 Consecration of the Cathedral of the Theotokos at Kiev (in 996)
 Glorification (1913) of Hieromartyr Patriarch Hermogenes of Moscow (1612)
 Discovery of the holy relics (1961) of Saint Irene of Lesvos the Virgin-martyr (1463)
 Second Uncovering of the relics (1992) of Righteous Simeon of Verkhoturye (1642)

Icon gallery

Notes

References

Sources
 May 12/25. Orthodox Calendar (PRAVOSLAVIE.RU).
 May 25 / May 12. HOLY TRINITY RUSSIAN ORTHODOX CHURCH (A parish of the Patriarchate of Moscow)
 May 12. OCA - The Lives of the Saints.
 Complete List of Saints. Protection of the Mother of God Church (POMOG).
 May. Self-Ruled Antiochian Orthodox Christian Archdiocese of North America.
 Dr. Alexander Roman. May. Calendar of Ukrainian Orthodox Saints (Ukrainian Orthodoxy - Українське Православ'я).
 May 12. Latin Saints of the Orthodox Patriarchate of Rome.
 May 12. The Roman Martyrology.
Greek Sources
 Great Synaxaristes:  12 ΜΑΪΟΥ. ΜΕΓΑΣ ΣΥΝΑΞΑΡΙΣΤΗΣ.
  Συναξαριστής. 12 Μαΐου. ECCLESIA.GR. (H ΕΚΚΛΗΣΙΑ ΤΗΣ ΕΛΛΑΔΟΣ). 
Russian Sources
  25 мая (12 мая). Православная Энциклопедия под редакцией Патриарха Московского и всея Руси Кирилла (электронная версия). (Orthodox Encyclopedia - Pravenc.ru).
  12 мая (ст.ст.) 25 мая 2013 (нов. ст.). Русская Православная Церковь Отдел внешних церковных связей. (DECR).

May in the Eastern Orthodox calendar